The San Gabriel Stakes is an American Thoroughbred horse race run at Santa Anita Park in Arcadia, California at the close of each year (though on occasion it is run in very early January). The Grade II race is open to horses, age three and up, willing to race one and one-eighth miles on the turf and offers a current purse of $201,000.

First run in 1935, it was contested on dirt through 1954. Since inception, the San Gabriel Handicap has been contested under various conditions and distances:
 3 furlongs : 1935, 1937, 1938, for two-year-olds 
 6 furlongs : 1945–1946, for three-year-olds
 7 furlongs : 1952–1954, as the San Gabriel Stakes for three-year-olds
 9 furlongs : 1960–present 
 10 furlongs ( miles) : 1955–1959.

The race has been contested twice in six of its years: in January and then again in December 1973, 1980, 1988, 1997, 2001, and 2006. It was run in two divisions in 1984.

The race was transferred to the dirt track in 1972, 1974, 1977, 1978, 1987, December 1988, 2005 and 2008.

There was no race in 1936, 1939–1944, 1947–1951, 1970, 1976, 1982, 1991, 1999 and 2004.

Records
Speed  record: (at current distance of  miles)
 1:46.20 – Wretham (1989)

Most wins:
 3 – Jeranimo (2010,2013, 2014)

Most wins by an owner:
 2 – Neil S. McCarthy (1938, 1956)
 2 – Andrew J. Crevolin (1953, 1954)
 2 – Mary F. Jones-Bradley (1971, 1977)
 2 – Linneo Eduardo de Paula Machado (1995, 1996)
 2 – Sidney H. Craig (1998, 2000)
 2 – Maktoum al Maktoum (2001, Jan & Dec)
 3 – B. J. Wright (2010,2013, 2014)

Most wins by a jockey:
 5 – Gary Stevens (1988, 1990, 1993, 1997, 2001)
 6 – Rafael Bejarano (2008, 2009, 2010, 2012, 2013, 2014)

Most wins by a trainer:
 7 – Charles Whittingham (1957, 1966, 1971, 1977, 1984, 1985, 1997)

Winners

References
 The December 28, 2008 San Gabriel Handicap at the NTRA

Horse races in California
Santa Anita Park
Graded stakes races in the United States
Turf races in the United States
Open mile category horse races
Recurring sporting events established in 1935